LGBT residents in the U.S. state of Georgia enjoy most of the same rights and liberties as non-LGBT Georgians. LGBT rights in the state have been a recent occurrence, with most improvements occurring from the 2010s onward. Same-sex sexual activity has been legal since 1998, and same-sex marriage has been legal since 2015. In addition, the state's largest city Atlanta, has a vibrant LGBT community and holds the biggest Pride parade in the Southeast. The state's hate crime laws, effective since June 26, 2020, explicitly include sexual orientation.

Laws against homosexuality

Homosexuality was previously criminalized based on the sodomy laws (which applied to both homosexuals and heterosexuals) which was struck down in 1998 by Powell v. Georgia (years before the 2003 federal-level strikedown by Lawrence v. Texas).

Recognition of same-sex relationships

Same-sex marriage

On November 2, 2004, Georgia voters approved Constitutional Amendment 1, which made it unconstitutional for the state to recognize or perform same-sex marriages or civil unions.

On June 26, 2015, the Supreme Court of the United States ruled in Obergefell v. Hodges that the fundamental right to marry must be guaranteed to same-sex couples. As a result, same-sex marriages became legal in the state of Georgia, along with all other U.S. states where such marriages were banned. Following the Supreme Court ruling, all Georgia counties began immediately (or were either willing) to issue marriage licenses to same-sex couples.

Domestic partnership

Prior to the nationwide legalization of same-sex marriages, some cities and counties in Georgia offered domestic partnership benefits to same-sex couples, which granted some of the marriage rights. Domestic partnerships were recognized by the cities of Athens, Atlanta, Avondale Estates, Clarkston, Decatur, Doraville, East Point, Pine Lake and Savannah, as well as DeKalb County and Fulton County.

Adoption and parental rights
On February 23, 2018, the Georgia State Senate passed the Keep Faith in Adoption and Foster Care Act (or SB 375), that called for allowing private adoption agencies receiving state funds to deny adoptions for certain couples or individual parents based on religious beliefs. Opponents claimed the bill targeted same-sex couples and LGBT individuals seeking to adopt. The Georgia House of Representatives did not eventually vote on the bill, effectively killing it.

The bill was reintroduced by Senator Marty Harbin on February 5, 2020, under the name SB 368, and is soon to be referred to the Senate Judiciary Committee.

On March 5, 2018, Governor Nathan Deal signed into law bill HB 159, which includes no restrictions against same-sex couples seeking to adopt.

There are no restrictions on either IVF or surrogacy.

Discrimination protections

Since June 26, 2020, Georgia protects its citizens from discrimination on the basis of sexual orientation.

Prior to Bostock v. Clayton County, Georgia, state law did not protect against employee discrimination based on sexual orientation or gender identity. However, some cities and counties in the state have enacted local ordinances banning such discrimination in varying degrees.

The cities of Atlanta, Clarkston and Doraville have ordinances prohibiting discrimination based on sexual orientation or gender identity in both public and private employment.

Gwinnett County has a Human Relations Commission that ensures fair and equal treatment and opportunity for all persons, with protections including gender identity and sexual orientation. In 2020, County Commissioner Ku stated that internal Gwinnett County policies were updated to provide protection that includes protections with gender identity and sexual orientation for public employment. In May 2021, The Columbus city council passed a resolution to make a create a similar panel, which will be voted on for approval by August 31.

Additional cities have enacted more limited protections, prohibiting discrimination against public municipal employees only. The cities of Athens, Augusta, Avondale Estates, Columbus, Decatur, Macon, Pine Lake and Savannah have ordinances banning discrimination based on sexual orientation or gender identity in public employment, while the cities of East Point, Sandy Springs, and Tybee Island, as well as the counties of DeKalb and Fulton have similar anti–discrimination ordinances in public employment covering only sexual orientation.

Glenn v. Brumby
Note that statutory law does not provide protections based on gender identity, but on December 6, 2011, in Glenn v. Brumby, the Eleventh Circuit Court of Appeals upheld a lower-court ruling that firing someone based on gender-nonconformity violates the Constitution’s prohibition on sex discrimination. The Court of Appeals found the Georgia General Assembly had discriminated against Vandy Beth Glenn, a transgender woman who was fired from her job as legislative editor after telling her supervisor that she planned to transition from male to female. This effectively provides legal protections to transgender and gender non-conforming employees in the states of Alabama, Florida and Georgia.

Anti–bullying laws

Georgia law bans bullying at schools, though it does not list individual protected groups.

Nonetheless, DeKalb County and Fulton County have regulations for teachers that address bullying and harassment based on sexual orientation or gender identity. Gwinnett County Public schools prohibits discrimination by sexual orientation and gender identity in their Student Conduct Behavior Code.

Atlanta LGBT cultural training
In September 2021, the city of Atlanta passed a city-wide ordinance that legally requires all city employees of Atlanta to undergo "LGBT cultural training".

Hate crime law
Both sexual orientation and gender identity are explicitly covered under the U.S. federal hate crime law since Matthew Shepard and James Byrd, Jr. Hate Crimes Prevention Act was signed into law in October 2009 by Barack Obama - right after being passed (as an attachment to a military funding authorisation bill) by US Congress.

In June 2020, the Georgia General Assembly overwhelmingly passed (47-6 vote in the Senate and 127-38 vote in the House) a hate crimes bill that explicitly includes sexual orientation. The bill was signed into law by Governor of Georgia Brian P. Kemp on June 26, 2020.

Gender reassignment

Identity documents 
Georgia permits post-operative transgender people to amend their sex on their birth certificates.

Healthcare 
On March 6, 2023, the Georgia Senate advanced a bill that would prohibit doctors from prescribing hormones or performing surgery on minors as part of gender-affirming care, but would not prohibit them from prescribing puberty blockers.

Transgender sports ban
In April 2022, a bill passed the Georgia General Assembly "at the last minute" to legally ban transgender individuals within female sports, athletics and/or Olympics teams. The Governor of Georgia Brian Kemp signed the bill into law and it went into effect on July 1, 2022.

US citizenship court case
In August 2020, a Georgia federal judge in Atlanta granted a daughter of two American married same-sex fathers US citizenship, despite being born in England to a surrogate.

Public opinion
A March 2004 Associated Press Exit Poll found that 42% of Georgia voters supported the legal recognition of same-sex couples, with 17% supporting same-sex marriage, 25% supporting civil unions or partnerships but not marriage, and 50% favoring no legal recognition.

A 2012 Public Policy Polling survey found that 27% of Georgia residents thought same-sex marriage should be legal, while 65% thought it should be illegal, while 8% were not sure. A separate question on the same survey found that 57% of Georgia residents supported the legal recognition of same-sex couples, with 24% supporting same-sex marriage, 33% supporting civil unions or partnerships but not marriage, and 40% favoring no legal recognition, with 3% not sure.

An August 2013 Public Policy Polling survey found that 32% of Georgia residents thought same-sex marriage should be legal, while 60% thought it should be illegal, while 9% were not sure. A separate question on the same survey found that 57% of Georgia residents supported the legal recognition of same-sex couples, with 28% supporting same-sex marriage, 29% supporting civil unions or partnerships but not marriage, and 39% favoring no legal recognition, with 3% unsure.

A September 2013 Atlanta Journal-Constitution survey found that 48% of Georgia residents thought same-sex marriage should be legal, while 43% thought it should be illegal, while 9% were not sure.

A 2017 Public Religion Research Institute (PRRI) poll found that 52% of Georgia residents supported same-sex marriage, while 39% opposed it and 10% were unsure. The same poll also found that 65% of Georgians supported an anti-discrimination law covering sexual orientation and gender identity, while 29% were opposed. Furthermore, 56% were against allowing businesses to refuse to serve gay and lesbian people due to religious beliefs, while 34% supported allowing such religiously-based refusals.

Summary table

See also

 Law of Georgia (U.S. state)
Shooting of Scout Schultz

References

LGBT rights in Georgia (U.S. state)